The Boys is a 1962 British courtroom drama film, directed by Sidney J. Furie and with a screenplay by Stuart Douglass.

Plot
Four youth Teddy boys are on trial for the murder of a garage night watchman in the course of a burglary on the night of 15 January.

Witnesses and the accused give differing accounts of the lead-up to the crime during a dispiriting and frustrating evening out in London. Flashbacks of the teenagers' insecure and sometimes alienated lives contrast strongly with the austere legality of the courtroom as, by degrees, the truth emerges.

The first part of the film is structured as a series of vignettes relating to the evidence of each witness who saw the boys on the evening in question. Each story helps to build an overall picture of their character. The overall message is that adults have presumed that they were bad without basing this presumption on any actual observation. Most of the witnesses admit that they prejudged the boys on the basis of their appearance. The boys admit to their defence counsel that they are hooligans and behave badly, but they deny murder.

Next we are given insights into the boys' home lives. Stan's mother is very ill and they are trying to get rehoused. Stan has a habit of constantly cleaning his fingernails with a flick-knife that is identical to the murder weapon. Barney is the most clean-cut of the group. Ginger is the only one with a job, on a building site, and has the most money, but he is also the most reserved. Much of the storyline revolves around the Three Aces, a pub opposite the Lantern Garage where the murder occurred.

The prosecution spots a flaw in the overall logic of the boys' stories: Stan says that he bought a packet of cigarettes for his mother at a time when he did not even have the bus fare home. The truth is revealed: Stan instigate the robbery, and was joined by Billy and Barney, but Ginger was unaware of any of this.

Ginger is acquitted; Billy and Barney, being under 18, are sentenced to be held indefinitely ("at Her Majesty's pleasure"; Stan, being 18, is sentenced to death.

Cast
Richard Todd - Victor Webster, prosecuting counsel
Robert Morley - Montgomery, defence counsel
Dudley Sutton - Stan Coulter
Ronald Lacey - William (Billy) Herne
Tony Garnett - Jim (Ginger) Thompson
Jess Conrad - Barney Lee
Felix Aylmer - The Judge
Wilfrid Brambell - Robert Brewer (as Wilfred Bramble)
Roy Kinnear - Mark Samuel (bus conductor)
Allan Cuthbertson - Randolph St John (as Alan Cuthbertson)
Colin Gordon - Gordon Lonsdale
Wensley Pithey - Mr Coulter (as Wensley Athey)
Kenneth J. Warren - George Tanner
Patrick Magee - Mr Lee
David Lodge - Mr Herne
Mavis Villiers - Celia Barker
Betty Marsden - Mrs Herne
Laurence Hardy - Patmore
Charles Morgan - Samuel Wallace
Carol White - Evelyn May
Patrick Newell - Crowhurst
Rita Webb - Mrs Lee
Tom Chatto - Morris
Harold Scott - Caldwell
George Moon - Mr Champneys
Hilda Fenemore - Mrs Thompson (as Hilda Fennemore)
Lloyd Lamble - Inspector Larner

Uncredited
Olga Dickie - Mrs Coulter 
Ian Fleming - Court official
Kevin Stoney - Police Inspector who is questioned at the trial 
Brian Weske - Club Announcer 
Ian Wilson

Reception
According to Kinematograph Weekly the film was considered a "money maker" at the British box office in 1962.

Soundtrack

The Shadows composed four songs for the film that were released as an EP.

Recent assessments of the film
The BBC calls the film an "innovative kitchen-sink drama charting the rise of teenage gang culture."
TV Guide states that, while there are "good performances all around," "the effect is muddled by a complicated flashback structure". According to website AllMovie, "The Boys benefits from Furie's dextrous use of flashbacks during the testimony scenes."

Legacy
On 17 September 2017, the 55th anniversary of the film's release, the three surviving "boys", Conrad, Garnett and Sutton, met for a reunion showing of the film at Elstree Studios, where the courtroom scenes were filmed. It was explained at the Q&A section of the event that this was the first time any of the four had met since the film was made.

References

External links

1962 films
1962 crime drama films
1960s English-language films
1960s British films
1960s legal drama films
British crime drama films
British legal films
British courtroom films
CinemaScope films
Films shot at Associated British Studios
Films about capital punishment
Films directed by Sidney J. Furie